The Mists of Avalon is a 2001 television miniseries based on the 1983 novel of the same title by Marion Zimmer Bradley.  Produced by American cable channel TNT, adapted by Gavin Scott, and directed by Uli Edel, the series is a retelling of the Arthurian legend with an emphasis on the perspectives of Morgan le Fay and other women of the tale. The first episode was the highest-rated original movie on basic cable in the summer of 2001.

Plot

Part I: Igraine and Uther
The film begins with a battered, dirty, and injured Morgaine riding in a small boat through a misty river. Most of the film is a reflection through her eyes, with Morgaine as narrator.

Morgaine is eight-years-old, living with her pagan mother Igraine and Christian father Gorlois. Igraine's younger sister, Morgause, lives with them; their older sister, Viviane, the Lady of the Lake, High Priestess of Avalon, along with the Merlin, current holder of the title of the chief Druid, come to Igraine with a prophecy that she will bear the king who is destined to beat the Saxons. Igraine is distressed after being told that the child will not be Gorlois', and she refuses to bear the heir. Merlin explains that the father of the great king would be wearing a dragon on his arm, but Igraine will not listen. Morgaine has a vision, seeing her father dead. Viviane notes that Morgaine has "the Sight".

The High King, Ambrosius, summons his nobles to a feast to name his successor, Uther Pendragon. Igraine is immediately drawn to Uther; Gorlois interrupts their discussion jealously.

After Uther is crowned, Gorlois rebels against him. Igraine sends a message by magic to Uther. The next day, Morgaine and her aunt Morgause find that Gorlois has ordered his guards not to let the women out, or any men other than himself in. Merlin and Uther arrive, and Merlin puts a charm on Uther to make him look like Gorlois. At first, Morgaine is thankful her father is alive, but she noticed the dragon of the man's arm and begins to understand that her "father" is Uther. 
Later, when Gorlois' corpse arrives, Morgause ignores the drama, since the man who delivered Gorlois' body, King Lot of Orkney, takes notice of her, and she falls in love. Uther takes Morgaine and Igraine to Camelot, where Igraine gives birth to Arthur Pendragon.

Part II: Morgaine is taken to Avalon
Arthur and Morgaine grow up loving each other dearly. When Arthur is five and Morgaine is thirteen, Viviane and Merlin return, saying that it is time to take Arthur away for his training with Merlin as future king. Viviane then orders Morgaine to come with her to Avalon to be trained as a priestess. Igraine and Uther do not want Morgaine to go, but Viviane threatens to withdraw Avalon's support of Uther, and Morgaine and Arthur are taken away from Camelot. Arthur and Morgaine are torn apart tearfully from each other, Arthur heading north with Merlin, and Morgaine heading south with Viviane. Viviane then takes Morgaine behind a misty curtain into a utopian island, Avalon. Viviane trains Morgaine to gain power of the elements, and in the servitude of the Three-fold Goddess. It takes ten years for Morgaine to be initiated, her final test being to part the mists. Igraine has a distressful vision of Morgaine "being taken."

Soon after her initiation, Morgaine meets her cousin Lancelot (whose mother is Viviane), a handsome and bold warrior. He has come to seek his mother's blessing in battle, but she is reluctant to give it. Morgaine shows him a stone circle, and she begins to fall in love with him. Lancelot sees through the misty veil a few Christian nuns and some virgin postulants walking down a path. One of them strays and seems as if she is aware of Avalon's existence. Lancelot begs Morgaine to open the mists for her, and she does so. The postulant is startled, but quickly smitten with Lancelot, as Lancelot is with her. The girl's name is Gwenhwyfar, daughter of a Welsh king. Morgaine immediately dislikes Gwenhwyfar, and closes the mists on her, separating them. Lancelot, annoyed, decides to defy his mother and leaves.

A few days later, on Beltane, Viviane sends Morgaine to be a part of a fertility rite as "The Virgin Huntress", where Morgaine is to make love to the man who kills the king's stag. Both partners are masked, so neither knows who the other is; still afterward, Morgaine longs for it to be Lancelot, but believes she will never be certain.

Part III: Arthur is crowned
Arthur, having completed his training with Merlin, finds his father, Uther, in a battle against the Saxons, just before he dies. He is locked in a burning church, and Arthur calls to both God and Goddess for help. Viviane, on behalf of the Goddess, answers, and gives Arthur Excalibur in exchange for loyalty to Avalon and paganism as well as Christianity. Arthur quickly agrees, and defeats the Saxons.

Morgaine is finally released from Avalon and returns to Camelot for her brother's coronation. She reunites first with Morgause, who is now Queen of Orkney and has a teenage son, Gawain. She then finds her mother, old and worn, sitting by a window with the Bishop Patrick. Igraine says that she is becoming a Christian nun and moving to Glastonbury. She says that she wants to seek repentance for betraying Gorlois long ago and being twice widowed. Morgaine is startled by this news and distressed.

Meanwhile, Arthur has been given a Christian Princess as his bride. As Arthur introduces his bride to Lancelot, she is revealed to be Gwenhwyfar. Lancelot and Gwenhwyfar are bewildered by this twist of fate, and have an awkward first meeting. Arthur then happily reunites with Morgaine. But soon, Arthur naively reveals that he was the King's Stag at the Beltane feast. Morgaine, shocked that she'd made passionate love to her own brother, cries in despair and shame. In a brief scene, Morgause is seen performing an infertility curse on Gwenhwyfar, a woman "she has decided to hate," cursing her to barrenness.

Arthur is crowned king under both the Pendragon and Christian banners. The Bishop Patrick then weds him to Gwenhwyfar; Merlin and Viviane appear startled, this union seemingly unexpected even to them. Morgause whispers to her husband that Gwenhwyfar will never have children, making her son Gawain next in line to the throne. Morgaine feels sick and quickly leaves the celebration. Morgause follows her; Morgaine reveals that she is pregnant but does not mention that Arthur is the father. Morgause is surprised—Morgaine's baby would inherit the crown before Gawain.

Arthur is called away soon after his coronation, leaving Gwenhwyfar in Lancelot's care. They go riding one day, only to be attacked by Saxons. Lancelot saves Gwenhwyfar from being raped, and they hide. Gwenhwyfar and Lancelot kiss, but vow that their loyalties are to Arthur first, not each other, and they swear to never have an affair.

Part IV: Mordred is born
Morgause concocts a potion to help Morgaine abort her pregnancy. Viviane stops Morgaine before she can drink it. Morgause warns Morgaine to never be Viviane's pawn. Morgaine is furious with Viviane for letting this abomination happen: a bastard child fathered by her own brother. Viviane wants this baby to be Arthur's heir, whose pagan roots would make him the greatest ruler Britain has ever seen. Morgaine renounces Viviane and Avalon, and moves to Orkney with Morgause. In the middle of winter, Morgaine gives birth to a son, Mordred. Morgause is advised by her husband, Lot, to kill the child. Indeed, Morgause has ample opportunity to kill him, as Morgaine is unconscious due to a fever she develops after childbirth. She sets Mordred in front of a cold open window. Morgaine suddenly calls out in her fever that Arthur is the father. Morgause gets a new idea and saves the baby and takes him to be nursed. She tells her husband that she will tutor and raise Mordred so the boy will have her influence. She even nurses Mordred for the first time herself.

Part V: Morgaine returns to Camelot
This begins the second part of the miniseries. Morgaine, convinced by Morgause, decides to return to Camelot. Arthur has become the great king everyone has hoped for, and Gwenhwyfar is beginning to grow distressed at her inability to produce the son Arthur needs to succeed him. Arthur assures Gwenhwyfar that they are still young and have years to bear children.

Morgaine returns to Camelot and is greeted by Arthur. She is introduced to Sir Accolon, a pagan Knight of the Round Table and son of the elderly pagan King Uriens of North Wales. Accolon and Morgaine are drawn to each other. Meanwhile, Lancelot is dealing with increased stress over Gwenhwyfar and his growing desire for her. Gwenhwyfar, obsessed with bearing children, resorts to asking Morgaine for a fertility charm. Morgaine obliges, and gives her the charm on the night of Beltane.

On the night of Beltane, at a feast, Arthur gets very drunk. Meanwhile, Morgaine, feeling insulted by Arthur's lewd remarks towards paganism, leaves the feast and rides out towards the field where the pagans light the Beltane fires and dance. Accolon follows her outside. Arthur, in the meantime, is taken to bed, barely awake, by a spirited Lancelot and Gwenhwyfar. Arthur then brings up how he notices Lancelot and Gwenhwyfar looking at each other, and how Gwenhwyfar has no child. Arthur, blaming the lack of an heir on himself, suggests that Gwenhwyfar sleep with both him and Lancelot in the hopes of conceiving the needed heir. Arthur emphasizes that Gwenhwyfar will be able to swear that the child was conceived in the king's bed. Lancelot and Gwenhwyfar are both skeptical, but Arthur persuades them, and they all bed down together. Meanwhile, Morgaine and Accolon kiss amongst the dancing pagans.

The next day, Lancelot is feeling regret for what he has done with Gwenhwyfar and Arthur. Morgaine realizes that Lancelot will never love her, so she devises an alternative to Lancelot feeling regret and sadness all his life. Gwenhwyfar has, by this time, gotten her period, and therefore still remains barren. Her serving woman, Elaine, is ecstatic, as Lancelot (encouraged by Morgaine) has asked her to marry him (she was previously seen looking at him). Gwenhwyfar, angered and distressed, dismisses her. Gwenhwyfar is also annoyed at Morgaine, who promised the charm would work, and resents Arthur for insisting the threesome would work.

At Lancelot and Elaine's wedding, Morgaine speaks with Merlin. Viviane is absent from her son's wedding, as the pagan banners of Pendragon have been taken down from Camelot due to Gwenhwyfar being hysterically upset with the "painted savages." Meanwhile, King Uriens discusses taking a second wife (he is a widower) with Arthur, and out of spite, Gwenhwyfar suggests Morgaine. Arthur is not too keen on the idea, but he and Gwenhwyfar ask Morgaine. Gwenhwyfar carefully words the proposal, and Morgaine thinks it is Accolon proposing, and accepts. She only finds out too late that she was engaged to the father, and not the son. Morgaine decides that it would be for the best to go through with the marriage, as Wales was an important political ally. Merlin, upset by Morgaine leaving Camelot with Uriens, leaves the feast.

Part VI: Mordred learns of his birthright
Merlin, upon returning to Avalon, dies of old age and tiredness, with Viviane horribly upset, and Avalon filling with mist. Morgaine, ironically, finds her marriage to Uriens to be the few happy years her life would bring her. Accolon becomes like a son to her, and for the first time in her life, she feels like part of a family.

Meanwhile, in Scotland, Mordred, Morgaine's son by Arthur, has grown to manhood. Viviane comes to him and tells him of his being next in line for the throne. Mordred takes this to heart and tells Morgause (whom he called "Mother") he is going to claim his birthright. When he arrives in Camelot, Arthur is planning to turn back the Saxons, who have come on Britain again in force. Mordred makes himself known to Arthur only as his nephew, his mother being Morgaine. Arthur is not told Mordred is his son, and Mordred is welcomed with open arms into Camelot.

King Uriens dies, and Morgaine decides to go back to Avalon. However, the mists will not open for her, and Morgaine believes the Goddess is dying. In despair, she crouches in the boat and lets herself float, only to be found by Igraine, still alive and living among the nuns. The women have a brief but happy reunion.

Mordred and Arthur, overlooking the knights one day, begin a discussion about the next heir. Mordred insists Arthur should name someone, but Arthur still believes Gwenhwyfar might still bear a son. Mordred insists he choose someone before Arthur dies in battle. Arthur says he needs someone of his own descent. It is here that Mordred reveals himself as Arthur's son and that Morgaine was the Virgin Huntress from long ago. Gwenhwyfar overhears this and runs away, embarrassed and despairing.

Part VII: The downfall of Camelot
Gwenhwyfar has fallen frantically into praying all day before her dozens of religious icons. One day Lancelot meets her there, and they plan a secret rendezvous, only to have Mordred overhear. Mordred catches the pair before they sleep together, and he threatens to take both of them before the king and have them hanged for infidelity. Lancelot and Gwenhwyfar escape, and they part for the last time. Gwenhwyfar enters Glastonbury, where Igraine meets her. Igraine takes her to Morgaine, still living there, and both women finally make amends with each other.

Morgaine goes back to Camelot, now in ruins, with various men crucified, hanged and decapitated along the walls of the palace. Mordred, Morgaine, Viviane, and Morgause all meet on the stairs to the palace. Viviane reveals Morgause's evil for all to see, reminding the people of the true ways of the Goddess; Morgause, in anger, takes a knife to kill Viviane, but Viviane catches the knife and accidentally stabs Morgause, who falls dead. Mordred, having thought of Morgause as his real mother, takes his sword and kills Viviane in turn. Because Viviane was Lady of the Lake, the sun is eclipsed, and Igraine senses her sisters are dead. Raven, a priestess who had taken a vow of silence, screams vocally for the first time in despair.

A final battle then is set to take place between the Saxons and Arthur's army. Lancelot joins him at the front lines just before the battle. Morgaine is off seeing over the cremation of Viviane and Morgause. Mordred has actually joined the Saxons and is leading them to Arthur. Morgaine sees this in a vision as the bodies of her aunts burn before her, and rides off to the battlefield. The fierce battle kills all until only Mordred and Arthur stand. Morgaine arrives all too late. She sees the bodies of Gawain, Accolon, and Lancelot among the thousands. Mordred and Arthur have both fatally wounded each other. Mordred dies first, in Morgaine's arms, but Arthur lingers. Arthur begs Morgaine to take him to Avalon.

Part VIII: A new incarnation
As in the beginning, Morgaine is in the boat. Arthur, barely alive, is lying in front of her; Morgaine tries to part the mists, but fails. Arthur holds out Excalibur, suggesting the Goddess needs an offering. Morgaine hurls the sword into the mist, where it is mystically transformed into a cross, and temporarily opens up the mists to Avalon. Arthur sees Avalon, and Morgaine declares, "We're home!" Arthur sees the beautiful land, and then dies. As Arthur dies, the mists close permanently.

Morgaine then goes to Glastonbury — not to live as a nun, but because she has nowhere else to go. She is convinced the Goddess is dead, until one day she sees a little girl praying at the feet of a statue that once represented the Goddess, but is now dressed as the Virgin Mary. Morgaine smiles, realizing that the Goddess has simply taken a new form, and that one day, perhaps the mists of Avalon will part again.

Cast

 Anjelica Huston as Viviane, Lady of the Lake
 Julianna Margulies as Morgaine
 Joan Allen as Morgause
 Samantha Mathis as Gwenhwyfar
 Caroline Goodall as Igraine
 Edward Atterton as Arthur
 Michael Vartan as Lancelot
 Michael Byrne as Merlin
 Hans Matheson as Mordred
 Mark Lewis Jones as Uther
 Clive Russell as Gorlois
 Tamsin Egerton as young Morgaine
 Christopher Fulford as Lot
 David Calder as Uriens
 Hugh Ross as Bishop Patricius
 Edward Jewesbury as Ambrosius
 Freddie Highmore as young Arthur

Reception

The Mists of Avalon was watched by more than 30 million "unduplicated viewers" during its premiere; the first episode "was the highest-rated original movie of the summer on basic cable." Critical reception was mixed but generally positive. USA Today gave the miniseries three stars out of four, crediting its success to Margulies, Huston and Allen as well as Gavin Scott's adaptation. Reviews from Entertainment Weekly  and The San Francisco Chronicle were also somewhat positive.  Hollywood.com said simply that the series "works" and that "instead of glorifying these legendary characters, Avalon fleshes out their weaknesses, desires and ultimate failures." Kendal Butler of  Culture Vulture felt that Hans Matheson as the adult Mordred "promptly walks off with the show" but that the overall production was hampered by "cheesiness" and failed to adequately convey the religious contention between the pagan beliefs and Christianity that were central to the novel.

The Mists of Avalon was nominated for an Emmy Award for Best Miniseries and Joan Allen and Anjelica Huston were nominated for Best Supporting Actress in a miniseries or movie. Margulies was nominated for a Golden Globe and Huston for a Screen Actors Guild Award.

Home media

See also
 List of films based on Arthurian legend
 List of historical drama films

References

External links
 
 

2001 American television series debuts
2001 American television series endings
2000s American television miniseries
Avalon Series
Television series based on Arthurian legend
American fantasy television series
Films directed by Uli Edel
Films scored by Lee Holdridge
Films shot in the Czech Republic
Incest in television
Television shows based on American novels
Television series by The Wolper Organization